BiTrektual is the ninth studio album by Cuban American dark cabaret singer Aurelio Voltaire, released on September 2, 2012. It is a concept album containing songs parodying the Star Wars and Star Trek franchises – Voltaire is a fan of both. It also contains a Doctor Who-related song, "It's Bigger on the Inside". The album's title is intended to be a pun on the word "bisexual".

"The Trouble with Tribbles" excepted, all the Star Trek-related songs were previously featured on Voltaire's currently out-of-print 2001 EP Banned on Vulcan; they were all re-recorded for this release. A re-recorded, extended version of "Cantina", a song previously featured on his 2007 album Ooky Spooky, is also present. "Poopin' on the Enterprise", "Yoda" and "Damn You, George Lucas!" are not songs, but rather spoken-word monologues by Voltaire originally included on his 2006 live album Live!. "Screw the Ocampa" is a parody of the Bahamian folk song "The John B. Sails", with lyrics heavily modified by Voltaire.

Robert Picardo, Garrett Wang and Tim Russ, all actors of Star Trek fame, and Jason C. Miller as well, provide additional vocals for some of the tracks.

Voltaire also made a contest on which fans would design the BiTrektual logo and cover art; the winner was eventually revealed to be artist Shamine King.

The cover features Voltaire dressed like Obi-Wan Kenobi kissing Hikaru Sulu.

Track listing

Personnel
 Aurelio Voltaire – vocals, acoustic guitar, production
 Brian Viglione – drums
 Maxim Moston – violin
 Argyle Johansen – tuba
 Melissa Elledge – accordion
 Peter Hess – clarinet (track 5)
 Johnny O'Reilly – backing vocals
 George Grant – bass, backing vocals, mixing
 Janelle Reichman – clarinet (track 12)
 Frank Morin – guitar (tracks 1, 3, 7, 11 and 14)
 Smith Curry – dobro, pedal steel guitar, Telecaster
 Gregory Hinde – piano (track 12)
 Roger Lian – mastering
 Shamine King – cover art

Guest vocals were provided by Jason C. Miller, Garrett Wang, Tim Russ and Robert Picardo. Wang, Russ and Picardo are known for portraying Ensign Harry Kim, Lieutenant Commander Tuvok and the Doctor in Star Trek, respectively.

References

2012 albums
Music based on Star Trek
Voltaire (musician) albums
Science fiction concept albums